Gauze is the debut studio album by Japanese heavy metal band Dir En Grey. The album was released on July 28, 1999. Five tracks were produced by X Japan co-founder Yoshiki Hayashi, all of which had been previously released as singles. The album was originally released on July 28, 1999 as a standard version with a thick CD case, 36-page booklet with the CD reading surface painted red, through East West Japan. An initial limited version was released on the same day, including a translucent red sleeve with a cloud pattern, 12-page picture booklet, a 36-page lyrics booklet, and the red painted CD in a maxi-CD single case for a sticker price of ¥3,059 ($). The album was later re-issued as standard version only, with a silver disc on October 31, 2001, through Free-Will. Although live performances of songs from this album have been extremely rare since 2003, the album still contains some of the band's most popular songs like "Cage" and "Yokan".

The lyrics booklet features two pages for each song; one features the lyrics, while the facing page features a picture and a small poem or verse, as a companion piece.

Track listing

Notes
 "Raison Detre" is French for "reason for being" (raison d'être with conventional diacritics).
 The kanji of the seventh track are printed in reverse on the packaging, transliterating as "Mitsu to Tsuba" (honey and saliva). "Tsumi to Batsu" (crime and punishment), however, is still considered the official title. This peculiarity is an example for lyricist Kyo's penchant for wordplay.
 "Mazohyst" in "Mazohyst of Decadence" is a Romanization of the Japanese loanword for masochist, マゾヒスト ("mazohisuto".)
 Most of the song "Gauze -Mode of Eve-" is a hidden track at the end of "Akuro no Oka". "Akuro no Oka"'s actual length is 8:30. The four second 13th track is a Red Book standard designed to accommodate the hidden outro.
 A re-recording of "-Zan-" appears as a b-side on their 2009 single "Hageshisa to, Kono Mune no Naka de Karamitsuita Shakunetsu no Yami".
 A remake of "Tsumi to Batsu" appears as a b-side on their 2011 single "Different Sense" under the title "Tsumi to Kisei". It was also released as an uncensored version on iTunes and as a live-limited single.
 A remake of "Mazohyst of Decadence" appears on the second disc of the Limited and Deluxe Editions of their 2022 album "Phalaris".

Personnel
Musicians
Dir En Grey – producer, arrangements
Kyo – vocals, lyricist
Kaoru – guitar
Die – guitar
Toshiya – bass guitar
Shinya – drums
Shelly Berg – violin ("Akuro no Oka")
Baez FX. - breathing (Zan)

Additional chorus
on Schwein no isu
Matsuyama 
Mikio
Okuyama 
Ōsaka
Shintani
You (Death Side)
Zigyaku 
バンチUFO
on Mazohyst Of Decadence
Kazue Tatsumi

Technique
Yoshiki – producer, arrangements ("Yurameki", "Cage", "Yokan", "-Zan-" and "Akuro no Oka")
Toru Yamazaki – co-producer ("Yurameki", "Cage", "Yokan", "-Zan-" and "Akuro no Oka")
Dynamite Tommy, Toshiyuki Takano, Norio Higuchi, and Takeyasu Hashizume – executive producers
Joe Chiccarelli – mixing (on Yurameki)
Eric Westfall – (on Cage)
Bill Kennedy – (on Zan)
Stan Katayama – (on Akuro no Oka)
Shelly Berg, Tom Halm & Yoshiki – string arrangements ("Cage" and "Akuro no Oka")
Michio – artwork

References

1999 albums
Dir En Grey albums
East West Records albums
Free-Will albums